Dulani Pallikkondage (born 27 May 1992) is a Sri Lankan rugby sevens player. She was selected to compete for Sri Lanka at the 2022 Commonwealth Games in Birmingham, they finished in eighth place.

References 

Living people
1992 births
Female rugby sevens players
Sri Lanka international women's rugby sevens players
Rugby sevens players at the 2022 Commonwealth Games